Stefan Stojanović may refer to:

Stefan Stojanović (footballer, born 2001), Serbian footballer
Stefan Stojanović (footballer, born 1988), Serbian football midfielder
Stefan Stojanović (footballer, born 1992), Serbian football forward
Stefan Stojanović (footballer, born 1997), Serbian football goalkeeper